Oncidium incurvum is a species of orchid endemic to Mexico (Veracruz to Chiapas).

References

External links 

incurvum
Endemic orchids of Mexico
Orchids of Chiapas
Flora of Veracruz